is a private university in Kodaira, Tokyo, Japan, established in 1957. The predecessor of the school was founded in 1942. The foundation that operates the school also operates a separate four-year college called Shiraume Gakuen College.

References

External links
 Official website 

Educational institutions established in 1942
Private universities and colleges in Japan
Universities and colleges in Tokyo
Japanese junior colleges
1942 establishments in Japan